Chiaramonte Gulfi (Sicilian: Ciaramunti) is a town and comune in the province of Ragusa, Sicily, southern Italy.

Geography
Its hamlets (frazioni) are the villages of Piano dell'Acqua, Roccazzo and Sperlinga.

The town is also called Balcony of Sicily for its panoramic position, with views over the Valley of the Ippari and its towns (Comiso, Vittoria, Acate) and all the way to the Mediterranean Sea if looking south, as far as Mount Etna in direction north and to the Erean Mountains with Caltagirone if looking west.

History
In the area numerous archeological sites from the Bronze Age and Iron Age have been found, as well as ruins dating to the Greek Archaic era and  Hellenistic era. Also Roman, Byzantine and medieval testimonies can be found.

The city was founded by the Greek colonists from Syracuse in the 7th century BC with the name of Akrillai. Destroyed a first time by the Carthaginians in 406 BC, it was rebuilt during the Timoleonic era. In 213 BC Akrillai was the location of battle in which the Syracusan army, led by Hippokrates, was defeated by the Roman army led by the Consul Marcus Claudius Marcellus. Thenceforth the city of Akrillai was part of the Roman province of
Sicily, its name being changed to Acrillae.

The ancient town was destroyed a second time by the Arabs under Asad ibn al-Furat in 827 AD, and the name Acrillae disappeared. The rebuilt centre was known by the Arabic name of Gulfi, which means "pleasurable place".

In 1299 Gulfi was besieged and captured by Roger de Lauria for the Angevines during the War of the Vesper; Manfredi Chiaramonte, who had been named Count of Modica by the Aragonese King Frederick III, moved the survivors to an upper location, called Baglio, which he fortified and protected with a castle.

In 1593 the town had grown outside the walls and had 5,711 inhabitants. It was nearly entirely destroyed by an earthquake in 1693, and was subsequently rebuilt.

Main sights
 Northern Gate or Arco dell'Annunziata, dating to the 14th century.
Basilica of Santa Maria la Nova, in the main square of the town.
Sanctuary of the Virgin Mary of Gulfi, located just south of Chiaramonte.
 Church of Santo Vito, on the southern part.
 Church of San John the Baptist, on the highest point of the town.
Villa comunale, the public gardens of Chiaramonte with a balcony with a panoramic view.

Economy
The local economy is based on agriculture, mainly olives, vineyards, vegetables, almonds and the raising of pigs and cattle. The area of Chiaramonte is also known for its olive oil that gained the Protected Geographical Status.

See also
 Monti Iblei Cup (Hill Climb)

Twin towns — sister cities
 Clermont, France.

References

External links

 Chiaramonte Gulfi official website

Municipalities of the Province of Ragusa